Nelda is a given name. Notable people with the name include:

Nelda Garrone ( 1880–?), Italian mezzo-soprano
Nelda Martinez (born 1961), American real estate agent and politician
Nelda Speaks (born  1943), American politician

See also
Zelda (given name)